The 205th Infantry Division (German: 205. Infanterie-Division) was a German division during the Second World War.

Initially formed as the 14th Militia Division (German: 14. Landwehr-Division), the division was mobilized a few days before the invasion of Poland in 1939, and remained on garrison duty in Germany throughout that campaign. It was the only Landwehr unit mobilized during 1939–1945 (others that were mobilized were reorganized as 3rd-Wave-style divisions), though the 97th Landwehr Division had been mobilized for the 1938 Anschluss.

It was renamed the 205th Infantry Division on 1 January 1940 and sent to France near the end of the western campaign. It was demobilized in July, but mobilized again in early 1941, and served as a garrison against any potential Allied invasion until early 1942.  It was then sent to the Eastern Front, where it served with Army Group Center in the "little Stalingrad" at Velikiye Luki over the winter of 1942–1943. The division was transferred to Army Group North in late 1943 and eventually trapped in the Courland Pocket, where it surrendered to the Soviets in 1945.

Commanding officers
Generalleutnant Ernst Richter (1 January 1940 – 1 March 1942)
Generalleutnant Paul Seyffardt (1 March 1942 – 5 November 1943)
Generalmajor Ernst Michael (5 November 1943 – 1 December 1943)
General der Artillerie Horst von Mellenthin (1 December 1943 – 19 October 1944)
Generalmajor Ernst Biehler (19 October 1944 – 15 November 1944)
General der Artillerie Horst von Mellenthin (15 November 1944 – 8 January 1945)
Generalmajor Karl-Hans Giese (8 January 1945 – 8 May 1945)

Order of battle

1940 

 Grenadier Regiment 335 (from Landwehr Infantry Regiment 40)
 Grenadier Regiment 353 (from Landwehr Infantry Regiment 59)
 Grenadier Regiment 358 (from Landwehr Infantry Regiment 182)
 Artillery Regiment 205
 I-IV Detachments
 Divisions Units 205

April 1944 

 Grenadier Regiment 335
 Grenadier Regiment 353
 Grenadier Regiment 358
 Artillery Regiment 205
 I-IV Detachments
 Panzerjäger Battalion 205
 Reconnaissance Battalion 205
 Engineer Battalion 205
 Signal Battalion 205
 Supply Troops

See also
 List of German divisions in World War II

References 

Note: The Web references may require you to follow links to cover the unit's entire history.
 Wendel, Marcus (2004). "205. Infanterie-Division". Retrieved April 3, 2005.
 "205. Infanterie-Division". German language article at www.lexikon-der-wehrmacht.de, with photos. Retrieved April 3, 2005.

Infantry divisions of Germany during World War II
Military units and formations established in 1939
1939 establishments in Germany
Military units and formations disestablished in 1945